Sergei Alekseyevich Beloglazov (born 16 September 1956 in Kaliningrad) is a Soviet and Russian former Olympic wrestler and World Champion. He trained at the Armed Forces sports society in Kaliningrad in 1976–77 and at Dynamo in Kiev since 1979. He was a two-time Olympic Champion in 1980 and 1988, a six-time World Champion and a World Silver medalist. He has a twin brother Anatoly Beloglazov, who was an Olympic Champion in 1980 and a three-time World Champion. He wrestled for coach Granit Taropin for the former Soviet Union. He is regarded by many to be one of the greatest freestyle wrestler of all time.

See also
 Wrestling at the 1980 Summer Olympics

References

Currently (as of April 2009) Sergei is the National Head Coach of the Wrestling Federation of Singapore.

External Links 
 Beloglazov's entry in the Encyclopædia Britannica
 World Class Videos On Sergie Beloglazov
 Goodwill Games

1956 births
Living people
Sportspeople from Kaliningrad
Soviet male sport wrestlers
Olympic wrestlers of the Soviet Union
Wrestlers at the 1980 Summer Olympics
Wrestlers at the 1988 Summer Olympics
Russian male sport wrestlers
Recipients of the Order of Friendship of Peoples
Recipients of the Order of the Red Banner of Labour
Olympic gold medalists for the Soviet Union
Armed Forces sports society athletes
Dynamo sports society athletes
Olympic medalists in wrestling
World Wrestling Championships medalists
Medalists at the 1988 Summer Olympics
Medalists at the 1980 Summer Olympics
World Wrestling Champions